Ormosia is a genus of crane flies in the family Limoniidae.

Species
Subgenus Neserioptera Alexander, 1956
O. perpusilla Edwards, 1912
Subgenus Oreophila Lackschewitz, 1935
O. absaroka Alexander, 1943
O. bergrothi (Strobl, 1895)
O. bucera Alexander, 1954
O. confluenta Alexander, 1922
O. flaveola (Coquillett, 1900)
O. hutchinsonae Alexander, 1935
O. leptorhabda Alexander, 1943
O. licina Alexander, 1966
O. longicornis Savchenko, 1980
O. parviala Petersen & Gelhaus, 2004
O. sequoiarum Alexander, 1945
O. sootryeni (Lackschewitz, 1935)
O. stenostyla Alexander, 1965
O. subducalis Alexander, 1940
O. triangularis Alexander, 1949
O. weymarni Alexander, 1950
O. yankovskyi Alexander, 1940
Subgenus Ormosia Rondani, 1856

O. aciculata Edwards, 1921
O. aculeata Alexander, 1924
O. adirondacensis Alexander, 1919
O. affinis (Lundbeck, 1898)
O. affixa Alexander, 1936
O. albertensis Alexander, 1933
O. albitibia Edwards, 1921
O. albrighti Alexander, 1954
O. alexanderi Savchenko, 1976
O. amakazarii Alexander, 1958
O. amicorum Savchenko & Tomov, 1975
O. anthracopoda Alexander, 1930
O. arcuata (Doane, 1908)
O. arisanensis Alexander, 1924
O. arnaudi Alexander, 1966
O. auricosta Alexander, 1933
O. autumna Savchenko, 1976
O. baldensis Mendl, 1974
O. beatifica Alexander, 1938
O. biannulata Alexander, 1936
O. bicornis (de Meijere, 1920)
O. bifida (Lackschewitz, 1940)
O. bigladia Alexander, 1966
O. bihamata Lackschewitz, 1935
O. bilineata Dietz, 1916
O. brachyrhabda Alexander, 1948
O. brevicalcarata Alexander, 1927
O. brevinervis (Lundstrom, 1907)
O. broweri Alexander, 1939
O. burneyana Alexander, 1964
O. burneyensis Alexander, 1950
O. carolinensis Alexander, 1925
O. caucasica Savchenko, 1973
O. cerrita Alexander, 1949
O. clavata (Tonnoir, 1920)
O. cockerelli (Coquillett, 1901)
O. cornuta (Doane, 1908)
O. cornutoides Alexander, 1940
O. croatica Stary, 1971
O. curvata Alexander, 1924
O. curvicornis Alexander, 1966
O. curvispina Alexander, 1936
O. cuspidata Savchenko, 1973
O. davisi Alexander, 1954
O. decorata Alexander, 1940
O. decussata Alexander, 1924
O. dedita Alexander, 1943
O. defessa Alexander, 1938
O. defrenata Alexander, 1948
O. denningi Alexander, 1976
O. dentifera Alexander, 1919
O. depilata Edwards, 1938
O. dicax Alexander, 1947
O. dicera Alexander, 1966
O. diplotergata Alexander, 1928
O. diversipennis Alexander, 1935
O. echigoensis Alexander, 1957
O. egena (Bergroth, 1891)
O. fascipennis (Zetterstedt, 1838)
O. fernaldi Alexander, 1924
O. filifera (Lackschewitz, 1940)
O. fixa Alexander, 1936
O. flavida Savchenko, 1973
O. formosana Edwards, 1921
O. fragmentata Alexander, 1940
O. frisoni Alexander, 1920
O. fugitiva Alexander, 1935
O. furcata Savchenko, 1973
O. furcivena Alexander, 1968
O. furibunda Alexander, 1954
O. geniculata (Brunetti, 1912)
O. gerronis Alexander, 1954
O. grahami Alexander, 1931
O. hallahani Alexander, 1943
O. harrisoniana Alexander, 1940
O. harsha Alexander, 1965
O. hartigi Mendl, 1973
O. hederae (Curtis, 1835)
O. helifera Savchenko, 1978
O. heptacantha Alexander, 1949
O. hispa Alexander, 1945
O. holotricha (Osten Sacken, 1860)
O. horiana Alexander, 1924
O. hubbelli Alexander, 1926
O. hynesi Alexander, 1962
O. idioneura Alexander, 1952
O. idioneurodes Alexander, 1968
O. idiostyla Alexander, 1968
O. inaequispina Alexander, 1940
O. inaperta Savchenko, 1976
O. inflexa Savchenko, 1973
O. ingloria Alexander, 1929
O. insolita Alexander, 1938
O. ithacana Alexander, 1929
O. kamikochiae Alexander, 1947
O. kashmiri Alexander, 1965
O. lackschewitzi Bangerter, 1947
O. laevistyla Alexander, 1933
O. lanuginosa (Doane, 1900)
O. legata Alexander, 1949
O. levanidovae Savchenko, 1983
O. lilliana Alexander, 1940
O. lineata (Meigen, 1804)
O. longicorna (Doane, 1908)
O. longispina Savchenko, 1983
O. loretta Alexander, 1976
O. lotida Savchenko, 1973
O. loxia Stary, 1983
O. machidana Alexander, 1933
O. megacera Alexander, 1917
O. meigenii (Osten Sacken, 1860)
O. mesocera Alexander, 1917
O. microstyla Savchenko, 1973
O. mitchellensis Alexander, 1941
O. moghalensis Alexander, 1965
O. monticola (Osten Sacken, 1869)
O. moravica Stary, 1969
O. multidentata Savchenko, 1973
O. nantaisana Alexander, 1921
O. neidioneura Alexander, 1973
O. neopulchra Alexander, 1968
O. nimbipennis Alexander, 1917
O. nobilis Alexander, 1964
O. nodulosa (Macquart, 1826)
O. nonacantha Alexander, 1954
O. notmani Alexander, 1920
O. nyctopoda Alexander, 1965
O. officiosa Alexander, 1936
O. onerosa Alexander, 1943
O. opifex Alexander, 1943
O. orientobifida Savchenko, 1983
O. paxilla Alexander, 1957
O. pernodosa Alexander, 1950
O. perplexa Dietz, 1916
O. perspectabilis Alexander, 1945
O. pirinensis Stary, 1971
O. pleuracantha Alexander, 1954
O. praecisa Alexander, 1932
O. profesta Alexander, 1936
O. profunda Alexander, 1943
O. proxima Alexander, 1924
O. pseudosimilis (Lundstrom, 1912)
O. pugetensis Alexander, 1946
O. pulchra (Brunetti, 1912)
O. rectangularis Alexander, 1934
O. remissa Alexander, 1953
O. rhaphidis Alexander, 1965
O. romanovichiana Alexander, 1953
O. rostrifera Savchenko, 1973
O. rubella (Osten Sacken, 1869)
O. ruficauda (Zetterstedt, 1838)
O. seclusa Alexander, 1936
O. sentis Alexander, 1943
O. serrata Savchenko, 1973
O. serridens Alexander, 1919
O. setaxilla Alexander, 1965
O. shoreana Alexander, 1929
O. solita Alexander, 1936
O. spinifex Alexander, 1943
O. staegeriana Alexander, 1953
O. subalpina Alexander, 1947
O. subcornuta Alexander, 1920
O. subdentifera Alexander, 1941
O. subfascipennis Savchenko, 1973
O. subnubila Alexander, 1920
O. subpulchra Alexander, 1966
O. subserrata Savchenko, 1976
O. taeniocera Dietz, 1916
O. tahoensis Alexander, 1950
O. takahashii Alexander, 1919
O. takeuchii Alexander, 1921
O. tennesseensis Alexander, 1940
O. tenuispinosa Alexander, 1936
O. tokionis Alexander, 1919
O. tokunagai Alexander, 1932
O. townesi Alexander, 1933
O. tricornis Alexander, 1949
O. umbripennis Alexander, 1966
O. unicornis Alexander, 1954
O. upsilon Alexander, 1947
O. uralensis Lackschewitz, 1964
O. zebrina Alexander, 1952

Subgenus Parormosia Alexander, 1965
O. angustaurata Alexander, 1936
O. atrotibialis Alexander, 1966
O. discalba Alexander, 1952
O. divergens (Coquillett, 1905)
O. diversipes Alexander, 1919
O. frohnearum Alexander, 1968
O. funeralis Alexander, 1952
O. fusiformis fusiformis (Doane, 1900)
O. fusiformis viduata Alexander, 1941
O. gaspensis Alexander, 1929
O. lataurata Alexander, 1936
O. leucoplagia Alexander, 1965
O. leucostictula Alexander, 1965
O. luteola Dietz, 1916
O. mahabharatae Alexander, 1965
O. nigripennis Alexander, 1936
O. nigripila (Osten Sacken, 1869)
O. nippoalpina Alexander, 1941
O. palpalis Dietz, 1916
O. peramata Alexander, 1965
O. perdiffusa Alexander, 1965
O. pygmaea (Alexander, 1912)
O. saturnina Alexander, 1972

References

Limoniidae
Tipuloidea genera
Taxa named by Camillo Rondani